William Poromaa (born 23 December 2000) is a Swedish cross-country skier who competes internationally.

He competed at the FIS Nordic World Ski Championships 2021 in Oberstdorf, where he placed fourth in the relay with the Swedish team.

Personal life
Poromaa is of Finnish descent through his paternal grandmother.

Cross-country skiing results
All results are sourced from the International Ski Federation (FIS).

Olympic Games

Distance reduced to 30 km due to weather conditions.

World Championships
1 medal – (1 bronze)

World Cup

Season standings

Individual podiums
3 podiums – (3 )

Team podiums
 1  podium – (1 )

References

External links

2000 births
Living people
Swedish male cross-country skiers
Swedish people of Finnish descent
Cross-country skiers at the 2022 Winter Olympics
Olympic cross-country skiers of Sweden
People from Gällivare Municipality
FIS Nordic World Ski Championships medalists in cross-country skiing